John Bernard MacGinley (August 19, 1871 – October 18, 1969) was an Irish-born clergyman of the Roman Catholic Church. He served as Bishop of Nueva Caceres (1910 – 1924) and Bishop of Monterey-Fresno (1924 – 1932).

Biography
John MacGinley was born in County Donegal, the sixth of thirteen children of Thomas Colin and Margaret Theresa (née Sinnott) MacGinley. His father served as principal of Croagh National School, and was author of General Biology and several works on folklore and scenery of western Donegal. He was educated at St Eunan's Seminary, Letterkenny and Blackrock College, Dublin, in his native country, and at the Pontifical North American College in Rome.

While in Rome, MacGinley was ordained to the priesthood by Archbishop Edmund Stonor on June 8, 1895. He earned a Doctor of Divinity degree in 1896, and came to the United States that same year. He then served as a curate at Our Lady of the Rosary Church in Philadelphia, Pennsylvania, until 1898, when he became professor of Latin and moral theology at St. Charles Borromeo Seminary. He remained at St. Charles for five years, and was made rector of the seminary at Vigan City in the Philippines in 1905. In 1910, he returned to Philadelphia, where he became a curate at St. Charles Church.

On April 2, 1910, MacGinley was appointed Bishop of Nueva Caceres in the Philippines by Pope Pius X. He received his episcopal consecration on the following May 10 from Archbishop Diomede Falconio, with Bishops John Edmund Fitzmaurice and Edmond Francis Prendergast serving as co-consecrators. Recalled to the United States, he was named Bishop of Monterey-Fresno, California, on March 24, 1924. He later resigned due to ill health on September 26, 1932; he was appointed Titular Bishop of Croae on the same date. He retired to Killybegs, in his native County Donegal, where he died at age 98.

References

Episcopal succession

1871 births
1969 deaths
Irish emigrants to the United States (before 1923)
Irish expatriate Catholic bishops
20th-century Roman Catholic bishops in the United States
People associated with St Eunan's College
People from County Donegal
St. Charles Borromeo Seminary alumni
People educated at Blackrock College
Roman Catholic bishops of Cáceres